French Hill may refer to:
French Hill (politician), American representative from Arkansas
French Hill (settlement), in northern East Jerusalem
French Hill, California, unincorporated community

Hill, French